There's a Girl in My Heart is a 1949 American musical comedy film directed by Arthur Dreifuss, starring Lee Bowman, Elyse Knox, and Gloria Jean. It was made by Allied Artists with many former contract stars from Universal.

Filming started 25 July 1949.

Plot

Cast

Lee Bowman as Terrence Dowd
Elyse Knox as Claire Adamson
Gloria Jean as Ruth Kroner
Peggy Ryan as Sally Mullin
Lon Chaney Jr. as Johnny Colton
Ludwig Donath as Prof. Joseph Kroner
Ray MacDonald as Danny Kroner
Joel Marton as Dr. Henlein
Richard Lane as Sgt. Mullin
Irene Ryan as Mrs. Mullin
Lanny Simpson as Lennie Dowd
Paul Guilfoyle as Father Callaghan
Iris Adrian as Lulu Troy
Kay Anne Nelson as Carol Anne
Martin Garralaga as Luigi
Lee Tung Foo as Charlie Li
Robert Emmett Keane as Capt. Blake

Reception
The Los Angeles Times said it was "Full of jingly merry singing and dancing."

References

External links

1949 films
1949 musical comedy films
1949 romantic comedy films
Allied Artists films
American black-and-white films
American musical comedy films
American romantic musical films
Films directed by Arthur Dreifuss
Films scored by Herschel Burke Gilbert
Films set in New York City
Films set in the 1890s
1940s romantic musical films
1940s English-language films
1940s American films